Mieczysław Zimowski (9 January 1901 – 6 February 1978) was a Polish footballer. He played in one match for the Poland national football team in 1923.

References

External links
 

1901 births
1978 deaths
Polish footballers
Poland international footballers
Place of birth missing
Association footballers not categorized by position